Ugochukwu is an Igbo name. Its literal translation is "God's Eagle", which is interpreted as "Crown of God" or even "Glory of God" — since the crowns of traditional Igbo rulers are adorned with a tail feather of an eagle.

Men with this given name
 Ugochukwu Amadi (born 1997), American football player
 Ugochukwu Ihemelu (born 1983), Nigerian-born American football player
 Ugochukwu Monye (born 1983), English rugby player 
 Ugochukwu Okoye (born 1981), Nigerian footballer 
 Emmanuel Ugochukwu Ezenwa Panther (born 1984), known as Manny Panther, Scottish footballer 
 Michael Ugochukwu Stevens, known as Ruggedman, Nigerian musician
 Ugochukwu Ukah (born 1984 in Parma), Italian-Nigerian football et

Women with this given name
 Ugochukwu Oha (born 1982), Nigerian basketball player

People with this family name
 John Ugochukwu (born 1988), Nigerian footballer 
 Lesley Ugochukwu (born 2004), French footballer
 Magalan Ugochukwu (born 1990), Nigerian footballer
 Mathias Ugochukwu (1926–1990), prominent Nigerian businessman
 Onyema Ugochukwu (born 1944), Nigerian economist and politician

See also

References

Igbo names
Igbo given names